This is a list of films which placed number-one at the weekend box office in Ecuador during 2013. Amounts are in American dollars.

References
 

2013 in Ecuador
2013
Ecuador